The 1955 Northern Illinois State Huskies football team represented Northern Illinois State College—now known as Northern Illinois University—as a member of the Interstate Intercollegiate Athletic Conference (IIAC) during the 1955 college football season. Led by Bob Kahler in his first and only season as head coach, the Huskies compiled an overall record of 0–8–1 with a mark of 0–5–1 in conference play, placing last out of seven teams in the IIAC. The team played home games at the 5,500-seat Glidden Field, located on the east end of campus, in DeKalb, Illinois.

Schedule

References

Northern Illinois State
Northern Illinois Huskies football seasons
College football winless seasons
Northern Illinois State Huskies football